Gold Peak Technology Group Limited, formerly Gold Peak Industries (Holdings) Limited, is a Hong Kong-based multinational corporation which is established in 1964 and has been listed on the Hong Kong Stock Exchange since 1984. The Group has built a few brand names for its major product categories, such as GP batteries, Recyko batteries, KEF premium acoustic products and Celestion professional speakers. The group has manufacturing and sales offices in more than 10 countries

The company changed its name to Gold Peak Technology Group Limited in March 2022 to reflect its business strategy and direction in advanced technologies and manufacturing of batteries and electronics, and its investment strategies in R&D, innovation, design and brands. 

Gold Peak Technology Group Limited currently holds approximately 86% interest in GP Industries, which is publicly listed in Singapore.

GP Industries Limited 

GP Industries is mainly engaged in the development, manufacture and marketing of electronics and acoustics products, including KEF premium acoustic products and Celestion professional speakers. The wholly-owned subsidiary, GP Batteries International Limited, specializes in the design and production of batteries and related products.

GP Batteries International Limited

GP Batteries manufactures and markets batteries and battery-related products including primary batteries, rechargeable batteries, portable energy solutions and accessories. GP Batteries is one of Asia's largest battery manufacturers, supplying battery products to original equipment manufacturers, battery companies as well as consumer retail markets under the GP brand name.

Incident 
Workers at GP factories have been routinely exposed to Cadmium dust, an extremely toxic metal used in the manufacture of Nickel-cadmium batteries that can cause kidney failure, lung cancer and bone disease. In 2006 more than 100 female factory workers in southern China attempted to sue their former employers (GP) over suspected cadmium poisoning.

On 24 August 2010, over a hundred workers protested outside GP's factory in Huizhou. GP had promised compensation to workers affected by poisoning but severely reduced the negotiated amount offering a "take it or leave it" situation.

Karin Mak's documentary Red Dust follows female workers fighting for medical care from their former employer, China's GP Batteries factory, after suffering years of cadmium poisoning.

References

External links 

 Gold Peak official website
 GP Industries official website
 GP Batteries official website

Battery manufacturers
Consumer battery manufacturers
Manufacturing companies of Hong Kong
Manufacturing companies established in 1964
Companies listed on the Singapore Exchange
Hong Kong brands
1964 establishments in Hong Kong